Morris Lichtenstein (1889–1938) was the founder of the Society of Jewish Science. Born in Lithuania, he later moved to Cincinnati, Ohio where he was ordained by the Reform Hebrew Union College in 1916, becoming the first Eastern European student to ever study at the institution.

Lichtenstein served as a Rabbi in Amsterdam, Troy, and New York City, where he received a Master's degree in Psychology from Columbia University in 1919. He briefly served a congregation in Athens, Georgia before moving back to New York to marry Tehilla Hirshenson in 1920. Together they founded the Society of Jewish Science in 1921 (or 1922).

After Lichtenstein's death in 1938, his wife took over his post and became the first Jewish woman in America with her own congregational  pulpit. However, she was never ordained, and never held a rabbinic title. She also took over his duties as editor of the Jewish Science Interpreter magazine, serving until her death in 1973.

Bibliography
Morris Lichtenstein, Jewish Science and Health, (New York, NY: Jewish Science, 1925)

See also
 List of New Thought writers
 New Thought

References 

1889 births
1938 deaths
American people of Lithuanian-Jewish descent
American Reform rabbis
Columbia University alumni
Hebrew Union College – Jewish Institute of Religion alumni
Emigrants from the Russian Empire to the United States
Rabbis from Cincinnati
Lithuanian Jews
New Thought writers